Richard Ramdeen (born 16 February 1988) is a Guyanese cricketer. He played in one first-class, three List A, and two Twenty20 matches for Guyana in 2010 and 2011.

See also
 List of Guyanese representative cricketers

References

External links
 

1988 births
Living people
Guyanese cricketers
Guyana cricketers